NIF3-like protein 1 is a protein that in humans is encoded by the NIF3L1 gene.

Interactions 

NIF3L1 has been shown to interact with COPS2.

References

Further reading